Cambarus parrishi, the Hiwassee headwaters crayfish, is a species of crayfish in the family Cambaridae. It is found in Georgia and North Carolina.

References

Further reading

 
 
 

Cambaridae
Articles created by Qbugbot
Crustaceans described in 1981
Freshwater crustaceans of North America
Taxa named by Horton H. Hobbs Jr.